The  is one of the oldest Christian churches in the city of Nagoya, central Japan. 

History
The church was established in 1888 by the French Catholic missionary Fr. Augustin Tulpin, thus making it the oldest church in Aichi. The present chapel was constructed in 1904 in a fusion of Western and Japanese architecture, and underwent various extensions and renovations since then. The presbytery was constructed in 1930. 

It is constructed in a fusion of Western and Japanese architecture. The chapel was constructed in 1904; it is still in use after several renovations.  As part of the Cultural Path of Nagoya, it is an important historic building of the city.

References

External links 

1888 establishments in Japan
Churches in Nagoya
Roman Catholic churches in Japan
Buildings of the Meiji period
19th-century Roman Catholic church buildings in Japan